Dimitrije Mladenović (1794-1890) was an Ecumenical Patriarchate of Constantinople Protoiereus in the Kumanovo kaza (district) of the Ottoman Empire.

Life
He was born in 1794 in the village of Proevce (now North Macedonia). He became a priest in 1818, then a protojerej (archpriest) in 1830, and finally an ikonom (churchwarden) of the Kumanovo district subordinate to the Metropolitan of Skopje (Patriarchate of Constantinople) in 1833. He was commonly known as the "Old Churchwarden" (Стари иконом).

In the period of 1847–51, the Church of St. Nicholas in Kumanovo was built by the ktitors: ikonom priest Dimitrije, Krsto Puto and his son Denko Krstić, priest Neša, Hadži-Stojilković, and the families of Rikačovci, Šapkalijanci, Borozani and Stojanćeajini.

He was taken down from the position of ikonom in 1855 but returned to the office a year later. In 1860 he and Denko Krstić were called to a hearing in Skopje by the Grand Vizier Mehmed Pasha Kibrizli, to be hanged, but paid for their release. Later in 1871 he was called by the vali in Prizren for questioning of his "immoral lifestyle", allegedly a campaign of the Bulgarian Exarchate, but he was released under a plea of the local population of Kumanovo to the Vali.

After the death of Dimitrije, Denko Krstić succeeded as the ikonom of Kumanovo. His daughter Katerina married Hadži-Vasilje from Vranje, from which marriage the acclaimed historian and ethnographer Jovan Hadži-Vasiljević sprung.

See also
List of people from Kumanovo

References

Sources
 (e-book)

People from Kumanovo
Members of the Ecumenical Patriarchate of Constantinople
1794 births
1890 deaths
Serbs of North Macedonia
Serbs from the Ottoman Empire